The term insectoid denotes any creature or object that shares a similar body or traits with common earth insects and arachnids.

Etymology
The term insectoid denotes any creature or object that shares a similar body or traits with common earth insects and arachnids. The term is a combination of "insect" and "-oid" (a suffix denoting similarity).

History 
Insect-like creatures have been a part of the tradition of science fiction and fantasy. In the 1902 film A Trip to the Moon, Georges Méliès portrayed the Selenites of the moon as insectoid. Olaf Stapledon incorporates insectoids in his 1937 Star Maker novel. In the pulp fiction novels, insectoid creatures were frequently used as the antagonists threatening the damsel in distress. Later depictions of the hostile insect aliens include the antagonists in Robert A. Heinlein's Starship Troopers novel and  the "buggers" in Orson Scott Card's Ender's Game series.

The hive queen has been a theme of novels including C. J. Cherryh's Serpent's Reach and the Alien film franchise. Sexuality has been addressed in Philip Jose Farmer's The Lovers Octavia Butler's Xenogenesis novels and China Miéville's Perdido Street Station.

Analysis 
The motif of the insect became widely used in science fiction as an "abject human/insect hybrids that form the most common enemy" in related media. Bugs or bug-like shapes have been described as a common trope in them, and the term 'insectoid' is considered "almost a cliche" with regards to the  "ubiquitous way of representing alien life".

See also
 Bug-eyed monster
 Insects in mythology
 Insects in religion
 List of fictional arthropods

References

External links

Science fiction themes
Insects and humans
Fiction about creatures